K. Sankaranarayana Pillai (3 November 1945 –  19 July 2021) was an Indian politician who was the Minister for Transport in Kerala from 2 April 1987 to 17 June 1991 in the Second E. K. Nayanar ministry. He was elected to the Kerala Legislative Assembly from the Thiruvananthapuram East constituency in 1982 and 1987.

References 

1945 births
2021 deaths
People from Thiruvananthapuram district
Kerala MLAs 1982–1987
Kerala MLAs 1987–1991